G&G Sindikatas is a Lithuanian hip hop/rap band, formed in 1996 by two members –  and Giga. By the year 1998 the duo disbanded leaving one member Svaras in search of beats and studio for recording new tracks. After finding an alternative music compilation released by studio Porno Sound, Svaras contacts Kastytis Sarnickas (Kastetas) and Donatas Juršėnas (Donciavas), two studio owners who help him record a debut album "Tavo sielos vagiz". Record sessions were joined by DJ Mamania. After the release of the first album Svaras invites Kastetas, Donciavas and DJ Mamania officially join the band. All four are known as the core members of the band to this day.

Discography

Studio albums

Singles
Betono džiunglėse (2002)
Muzika, kuri saugo (2004)
Degantis sniegas (2006)
Tiems, kas rašo (2007)
Žaibo rykštė (2011)
Tiems kurie nieko nebijo (2017)

References

Lithuanian musical groups
Hip hop groups
Music in Vilnius
1996 establishments in Lithuania
Musical groups established in 1996